Roberto Fabián Ayala (born 14 April 1973), nicknamed El Ratón ("The Mouse"), is an Argentine former footballer who played as a centre back for the Argentina national football team, as well as Valencia and Real Zaragoza in Spain, Milan and Napoli in Italy, and Ferro Carril, River Plate and Racing Club in his native Argentina.

Regarded as one of the best central defenders of his generation, he stood out for his leadership and ability in the air throughout his career in spite of his small stature as a centre back. Ayala captained Argentina in a record 63 matches. He played in three FIFA World Cups and made a total of 115 international appearances, behind only Javier Mascherano, Javier Zanetti and Lionel Messi in terms of international appearances.

Club career

Early career in Argentina 
Ayala began his career in his native Argentina, playing for Ferro Carril Oeste. After three seasons, he moved to River Plate where his good form attracted the attention of clubs in Europe.

Move to Europe

Parma, Napoli and Milan 
Italian side Parma brought the Argentine defender to Europe. However, the club, having already used their quota of three non-EU players, loaned him to Napoli, who purchased 50% of his rights on a co-ownership deal. Ayala was bought by Milan at the end of the 1997–98 season and played there for two seasons until Valencia purchased him for £6.25 million.

Valencia 
After signing with Valencia in the summer of 2000, Ayala made 275 appearances during a seven-year spell at the club.

On 24 September 2000, Ayala made his debut for Valencia in a 3–0 La Liga win over Numancia. He soon established himself as a first choice central defender for Los Che and started alongside compatriot Mauricio Pellegrino in the 2001 UEFA Champions League final, where Valencia lost 5–4 to Bayern Munich after a penalty shootout. He was later named best defender for the 2000–01 tournament.

The following season, Ayala was part of the Valencia team that won the 2001–02 La Liga title. He scored the opening goal of a 2–0 defeat of Málaga which secured the championship on 5 May 2002. In 2003–04, Valencia again won the La Liga title and beat Marseille 2–0 in Gothenburg to win the UEFA Cup.

During the 2004–05 season, injuries kept Ayala from much of the La Liga campaign as well as the UEFA Super Cup victory over Porto.

During his time with Valencia, he was widely regarded as one of the finest central defenders in the world and is considered to be one of the club's all-time legends.

Villarreal and Real Zaragoza 
In August 2006, Ayala was not offered a new contract by sporting director Amedeo Carboni. On 7 February 2007, he announced he would join regional rivals Villarreal at the end of the season, however before having played for Villarreal, he joined Real Zaragoza on a three-year deal on 14 July 2007. The buy-out clause in his contract with Villarreal was €6 million (£4.8 million) which was paid in full by Real Zaragoza.

On 3 May 2008, Ayala scored his first goal for Real Zaragoza in the 94th minute against Deportivo de La Coruña to lead Zaragoza to a 1–0 victory. Zaragoza, however, were relegated to the Segunda División. On 22 November 2008, Ayala scored his second goal for Zaragoza, in the 73rd of a 3–0 win over Eibar. On 29 February 2009, he scored his third goal coming in the 54th minute against Real Murcia as Zaragoza won the match 4–1.

In January 2010, Ayala's contract with Zaragoza was terminated by mutual consent.

Racing Avellaneda 
On 2 February 2010, Argentine side Racing Club signed Ayala on a free transfer.

International career 
Ayala made his debut for Argentina on 16 November 1994 against Chile under coach Daniel Passarella.

Ayala played for Argentina U23 at the 1996 Summer Olympics, winning the silver medal. He played for Argentina in the 1998 FIFA World Cup and was a non-playing squad member in the 2002 competition due to a last-minute injury moments before their first match against Nigeria. He was selected as one of the three overage players then Argentina U23 won the gold medal at the 2004 Summer Olympics. Ayala played an integral part in the Argentine squad for the 2006 World Cup in Germany. He played brilliantly throughout the tournament and was picked as a member of the All Star Team. In the quarter-final against Germany, he scored a header that gave Argentina the 1–0 lead, although his side lost the penalty shootout after a 1–1 draw, with Ayala's spot kick being saved by Jens Lehmann.

On 30 May 2006, In a friendly match against Angola, Ayala earned his 100th cap for Argentina.
 
One of the best defenders in Argentina's history, on 7 February 2007 Ayala became the most capped player of the national team (most as captain), beating his friend Diego Simeone, in a friendly victory 1–0 against France played in the Stade de France in Paris.

On 5 June 2007, in a friendly against Algeria, Ayala captained Argentina for a record 58th international, having equalled Diego Maradona's mark of 57 in the 1–1 draw against Switzerland in Basel on 2 June.

On 17 July 2007, two days after playing in the 2007 Copa América Final, which ended in a 3–0 defeat to Brazil, and during which he scored an own goal, Ayala announced his retirement from international football. Ayala stated, "it has nothing to do with what happened in the final of the Copa América." Javier Zanetti took over from him as captain.

After retiring

Racing Club
On 30 December, Ayala retired from professional football. On 21 December 2011, Ayala was hired as a football coordinator at Racing Club. In September 2013, a new management arrived, and Ayala was released on 19 September 2013.

Valencia CF
In December 2013, Ayala was hired as a technical director / sport director for Valencia, where he was going to be the responsible for the whole South American area. The role also involved him scouting in that area to find young talents. He left the club in the middle of 2015.

Argentina
On 10 January 2019, Ayala joined the technical staff of the Argentina national football team as a field assistant of manager Lionel Scaloni.

Style of play 
Regarded as one of the best and most accomplished defenders of all time, Ayala was mainly known for his ability in the air and tenacious tackling, and also stood out for his leadership and consistency throughout his career. A complete defender, he was also noted for his speed, ability on the ball, and passing accuracy as a centre-back.

Personal life 
Ayala is married to Veronica, and has four children: Francisco, Sofía, Pilar and Martina.

Career statistics

Club

International

Scores and results list Argentina's goal tally first, score column indicates score after each Ayala goal.

Honours 
As an assistant manager
 FIFA World Cup: Winner 2022
 Copa America: Winner 2021, third-place 2019
 2022 Finalissima

River Plate
 Argentine Primera División: 1994 Apertura

Milan
 Serie A: 1998–99

Valencia
 La Liga: 2001–02, 2003–04
 UEFA Cup: 2003–04

Argentina U23
Pan American Games: 1995
 Olympic Gold Medal: 2004

Individual
 South American Team of the Year: 1994
 UEFA Club Best Defender of the Year: 2000–01
 European Sports Media Team of the Year: 2003–04
 2006 FIFA World Cup All-Star Team

See also
 List of men's footballers with 100 or more international caps

References

External links

 Argentine Primera statistics at Fútbol XXI 

Argentine footballers
Argentina international footballers
Association football central defenders
Association football sweepers
A.C. Milan players
Ferro Carril Oeste footballers
Club Atlético River Plate footballers
S.S.C. Napoli players
Valencia CF players
UEFA Cup winning players
Real Zaragoza players
Racing Club de Avellaneda footballers
La Liga players
Serie A players
Olympic footballers of Argentina
Olympic gold medalists for Argentina
Olympic silver medalists for Argentina
Footballers at the 1996 Summer Olympics
Footballers at the 2004 Summer Olympics
1998 FIFA World Cup players
2002 FIFA World Cup players
2006 FIFA World Cup players
1995 King Fahd Cup players
1995 Copa América players
1999 Copa América players
2004 Copa América players
2007 Copa América players
People from Paraná, Entre Ríos
1973 births
Living people
Argentine people of Basque descent
FIFA Century Club
Argentine expatriate footballers
Expatriate footballers in Italy
Expatriate footballers in Spain
Argentine Primera División players
Argentine expatriate sportspeople in Italy
Argentine expatriate sportspeople in Spain
Olympic medalists in football
Medalists at the 2004 Summer Olympics
Medalists at the 1996 Summer Olympics
Pan American Games gold medalists for Argentina
Pan American Games medalists in football
Footballers at the 1995 Pan American Games
Medalists at the 1995 Pan American Games
Sportspeople from Entre Ríos Province